Mesocestoides is a genus of flatworms belonging to the family Mesocestoididae.

The genus has cosmopolitan distribution.

Species:

Mesocestoides alaudae 
Mesocestoides ambiguus 
Mesocestoides angustatus 
Mesocestoides canislagopodis 
Mesocestoides imbutiformis 
Mesocestoides leptothylacus 
Mesocestoides lineatus 
Mesocestoides litteratus 
Mesocestoides melesi 
Mesocestoides perlatus 
Mesocestoides petrowi 
Mesocestoides zacharovae

References

Platyhelminthes